Maltese (also L-Ilsien Malti or Il-Lingwa Maltija) is a Semitic language derived from late medieval Sicilian Arabic with Romance superstrata spoken by the Maltese people. It is the national language of Malta and the only official Semitic and Afro-Asiatic language of the European Union. Maltese is a latinised variety of spoken historical Arabic through its descent from Siculo-Arabic, which developed as a Maghrebi Arabic dialect in the Emirate of Sicily between 831 and 1091. As a result of the Norman invasion of Malta and the subsequent re-Christianisation of the islands, Maltese evolved independently of Classical Arabic in a gradual process of latinisation. It is therefore exceptional as a variety of historical Arabic that has no diglossic relationship with Classical or Modern Standard Arabic. Maltese is thus classified separately from the 30 varieties constituting the modern Arabic macrolanguage. Maltese is also distinguished from Arabic and other Semitic languages since its morphology has been deeply influenced by Romance languages, namely Italian and Sicilian.

The original Arabic base comprises around one-third of the Maltese vocabulary, especially words that denote basic ideas and the function words, but about half of the vocabulary is derived from standard Italian and Sicilian; and English words make up between 6% and 20% of the vocabulary. A 2016 study shows that, in terms of basic everyday language, speakers of Maltese are able to understand around a third of what is said to them in Tunisian Arabic, which is a Maghrebi Arabic related to Siculo-Arabic, whereas speakers of Tunisian Arabic are able to understand about 40% of what is said to them in Maltese. This reported level of asymmetric intelligibility is considerably lower than the mutual intelligibility found between other varieties of Arabic.

Maltese has always been written in the Latin script, the earliest surviving example dating from the late Middle Ages. It is the only standardised Semitic language written exclusively in the Latin script.

History

The origins of the Maltese language are attributed to the arrival, early in the 11th century, of settlers from neighbouring Sicily, where Siculo-Arabic was spoken, reversing the Fatimid Caliphate's conquest of the island at the end of the 9th century. This claim has been corroborated by genetic studies, which show that contemporary Maltese people share common ancestry with Sicilians and Calabrians, with little genetic input from North Africa and the Levant.

The Norman conquest in 1091, followed by the expulsion of the Muslims—complete by 1249—permanently isolated the vernacular from its Arabic source, creating the conditions for its evolution into a distinct language. In contrast to Sicily—where Siculo-Arabic became extinct and was replaced by Sicilian—the vernacular in Malta continued to develop alongside Italian, eventually replacing it as official language in 1934 – alongside English. The first written reference to the Maltese language is in a will of 1436, where it is called . The oldest known document in Maltese,  by Pietru Caxaro, dates from the 15th century.

The first systematic lexicon is that of Giovanni Pietro Francesco Agius de Soldanis, who also wrote the first systematic grammar of the language and proposed a standard orthography.

Demographics
Most speakers also use English.

The largest diaspora community of Maltese speakers is in Australia, with 36,000 speakers reported in 2006 (down from 45,000 in 1996, and expected to decline further).

The Maltese linguistic community in Tunisia originated in the 18th century. Numbering several thousand in the 19th century, it was reported to be only 100 to 200 people as of 2017.

Classification
Maltese is descended from Siculo-Arabic, a Semitic language within the Afroasiatic family, that in the course of its history has been influenced by Sicilian and Italian, to a lesser extent French, and more recently English. Today, the core vocabulary (including both the most commonly used vocabulary and function words) is Semitic, with large numbers of loanwords. Because of the Sicilian influence on Siculo-Arabic, Maltese has many language contact features and is most commonly described as a language with a large number of loanwords.

The Maltese language has historically been classified in various ways, with some claiming that the ancient Punic language (another Semitic language) was its origin instead of Siculo-Arabic, while others believed the language to be one of the Berber languages (another family within Afroasiatic),. The Fascist Kingdom of Italy classified it as regional Italian.

Dialects

Urban varieties of Maltese are closer to Standard Maltese than rural varieties, which have some characteristics that distinguish them from Standard Maltese.
Another archaic feature is the realisation of Standard Maltese ā as ō in rural dialects.
There is also a tendency to diphthongise simple vowels, e.g., ū becomes eo or eu.
Rural dialects also tend to employ more Semitic roots and broken plurals than Standard Maltese. In general, rural Maltese is less distant from its Siculo-Arabic ancestor than is Standard Maltese.

Phonology

Consonants

Voiceless stops are only lightly aspirated and voiced stops are fully voiced. Voicing is carried over from the last segment in obstruent clusters; thus, two- and three-obstruent clusters are either voiceless or voiced throughout, e.g.  is realised  "we write" (similar assimilation phenomena occur in languages like French or Czech). Maltese has final-obstruent devoicing of voiced obstruents and voiceless stops have no audible release, making voiceless–voiced pairs phonetically indistinguishable.

Gemination is distinctive word-medially and word-finally in Maltese. The distinction is most rigid intervocalically after a stressed vowel. Stressed, word-final closed syllables with short vowels end in a long consonant, and those with a long vowel in a single consonant; the only exception is where historic  and  meant the compensatory lengthening of the succeeding vowel. Some speakers have lost length distinction in clusters.

"newspaper" and  "television". The pharyngeal fricative  is velar, uvular, or glottal for some speakers.

Vowels
Maltese has five short vowels, written a e i o u; six long vowels, written a, e, ie, i, o, u, all of which (with the exception of ie ) can be known to represent long vowels in writing only if they are followed by an orthographic għ or h (otherwise, one needs to know the pronunciation; e.g. nar (fire) is pronounced ); and seven diphthongs, written aj or għi, aw or għu, ej or għi, ew, iw, oj, and ow or għu.

Stress

Stress is generally on the penultimate syllable, unless some other syllable is heavy (has a long vowel or final consonant), or unless a stress-shifting suffix is added. (Suffixes marking gender, possession, and verbal plurals do not cause the stress to shift). Historically when vowel a and u were long or stressed they were written as â or û, for example in the word baħħâr (sailor) to differentiate from baħħar (to sail), but nowadays these accents are mostly omitted.

When two syllables are equally heavy, the penultimate takes the stress, but otherwise the heavier syllable does, e.g. bajjad  'he painted' vs bajjad  'a painter'.

Historical phonology

The original Arabic consonant system has undergone partial collapse under European influence, with many Classical Arabic consonants having undergone mergers and modifications in Maltese:

Orthography

Alphabet

The modern system of Maltese orthography was introduced in 1924.
Below is the Maltese alphabet, with IPA symbols and approximate English pronunciation:

Final vowels with grave accents (à, è, ì, ò, ù) are also found in some Maltese words of Italian origin, such as libertà ("freedom"), sigurtà (old Italian: sicurtà, "security"), or soċjetà (Italianː società, "society").

The official rules governing the structure of the Maltese language are recorded in the official guidebook Tagħrif fuq il-Kitba Maltija (English: Knowledge on Writing in Maltese) issued by the Akkademja tal-Malti (Academy of the Maltese language). The first edition of this book was printed in 1924 by the Maltese government's printing press. The rules were further expanded in the 1984 book, iż-Żieda mat-Tagħrif, which focused mainly on the increasing influence of Romance and English words. In 1992 the Academy issued the Aġġornament tat-Tagħrif fuq il-Kitba Maltija, which updated the previous works. All these works were included in a revised and expanded guidebook published in 1996.

The National Council for the Maltese Language (KNM) is the main regulator of the Maltese language (see Maltese Language Act, below). However, the Academy's orthography rules are still valid and official.

Written Maltese
Since Maltese evolved after the Italo-Normans ended Arab rule of the islands, a written form of the language was not developed for a long time after the Arabs' expulsion in the middle of the thirteenth century. Under the rule of the Knights Hospitaller, both French and Italian were used for official documents and correspondence. During the British colonial period, the use of English was encouraged through education, with Italian being regarded as the next-most important language.

In the late 18th century and throughout the 19th century, philologists and academics such as Mikiel Anton Vassalli made a concerted effort to standardise written Maltese. Many examples of written Maltese exist from before this period, always in the Latin alphabet, Il-Kantilena from the 15th century being the earliest example of written Maltese. In 1934, Maltese was recognised as an official language.

Sample
The Maltese language has a tendency to have both Semitic vocabulary and also vocabulary derived from Romance languages, primarily Italian. Words such as tweġiba (Arab origin) and risposta (Italian origin) have the same meaning (answer) but can and are both used in Maltese. Below are two versions of the same translations, one in vocabulary derived mostly from Semitic root words while the other uses Romance loanwords (from the Treaty establishing a Constitution for Europe, see p. 17):

Vocabulary
Although the original vocabulary of the language was Siculo-Arabic, it has incorporated a large number of borrowings from Romance sources of influence (Sicilian, Italian, and French) and, more recently, Germanic ones (from English).

The historical source of modern Maltese vocabulary is 52% Italian/Sicilian, 32% Siculo-Arabic, and 6% English, with some of the remainder being French. Today, most function words are Semitic, so despite only making up about a third, they are the most used among Maltese people when conversing. In this way, it is similar to English, which is a Germanic language that had large influence from Norman French and Latin (58% of English vocabulary). As a result of this, Romance language-speakers may easily be able to comprehend conceptual ideas expressed in Maltese, such as "Ġeografikament, l-Ewropa hi parti tas-superkontinent ta' l-Ewrasja" (Geographically, Europe is part of the Supercontinent of Eurasia), while not understanding a single word of a functional sentence such as "Ir-raġel qiegħed fid-dar" (The man is in the house), which would be easily understood by any Arabic speaker.

Romance
An analysis of the etymology of the 41,000 words in Aquilina's Maltese-English Dictionary shows that words of Romance origin make up 52% of the Maltese vocabulary, although other sources claim from as low as 40%, to as high as 55%. This vocabulary tends to deal with more complex concepts. Also, as with Old Sicilian,  (English 'sh') is written 'x' and this produces spellings such as: ambaxxata  ('embassy'), xena  ('scene' cf. Italian ambasciata, scena).

A tendency in modern Maltese is to adopt further influences from English and Italian.
Complex Latinate English words adopted into Maltese are often given Italianate or Sicilianate forms, even if the resulting words do not appear in either of those languages. For instance, the words "evaluation", "industrial action", and "chemical armaments" become "evalwazzjoni", "azzjoni industrjali", and "armamenti kimiċi" in Maltese, while the Italian terms are valutazione, vertenza sindacale, and armi chimiche respectively. (The origin of the terms may be narrowed even further to British English; the phrase "industrial action" is meaningless in the United States.) This is also comparable to the situation with English borrowings into the Italo-Australian dialect. English words of Germanic origin are generally preserved relatively unchanged.

Some influences of African Romance on Arabic and Berber spoken in the Maghreb are theorised, which may then have passed into Maltese. For example, in calendar month names, the word furar "February" is only found in the Maghreb and in Maltese - proving the word's ancient origins. The region also has a form of another Latin named month in awi/ussu < augustus. This word does not appear to be a loan word through Arabic, and may have been taken over directly from Late Latin or African Romance. Scholars theorise that a Latin-based system provided forms such as awi/ussu and furar in African Romance, with the system then mediating Latin/Romance names through Arabic for some month names during the Islamic period. The same situation exists for Maltese which mediated words from Italian, and retains both non-Italian forms such as awissu/awwissu and frar, and Italian forms such as april.

Siculo-Arabic
Siculo-Arabic is the ancestor of the Maltese language, and supplies between 32% and 40% of the language's vocabulary.

 found that 40% of a sample of 1,821 Quranic Arabic roots were found in Maltese, a lower percentage than found in Moroccan (58%) and Lebanese Arabic (72%). An analysis of the etymology of the 41,000 words in Aquilina's Maltese-English Dictionary shows that 32% of the Maltese vocabulary is of Arabic origin, although another source claims 40%. Moreover,  in Maltese tend to aim mainly at diction belonging to this group.

The Maltese language has merged many of the original Arabic consonants, in particular the emphatic consonants, with others that are common in European languages. The vowels, however, separated from the three in Arabic into five, as is more typical of other European languages. Some unstressed short vowels have been elided.

Since the attested vocabulary of Siculo-Arabic is limited, the following table compares cognates in Maltese and some other varieties of Arabic (all forms are written phonetically, as in the source):

English
It is estimated that English loanwords, which are becoming more commonplace, make up 20% of the Maltese vocabulary, although other sources claim amounts as low as 6%. This percentage discrepancy is due to the fact that a number of new English loanwords are sometimes not officially considered part of the Maltese vocabulary; hence, they are not included in certain dictionaries. Also, English loanwards of Latinate origin are very often Italianised, as discussed above. English loanwords are generally transliterated, although standard English pronunciation is virtually always retained. Below are a few examples:

"Fridge" is a common shortening of "refrigerator". "Refrigerator" is a Latinate word which could be imported into Maltese as rifriġeratori, whereas the Italian word is frigorifero or refrigeratore.

Calendar 
The days of the week (Maltese: jiem il-ġimgħa) in Maltese are referred to by number, as is typical of other Semitic languages, especially Arabic. Days of the week are commonly preceded by the word nhar meaning 'day'.

The months of the year (Maltese: xhur is-sena) in Maltese are mostly derived from Sicilian, but Frar and Awwissu are possibly derived from African Romance through Siculo-Arabic.

Time

Question words

Grammar
Maltese grammar is fundamentally derived from Siculo-Arabic, although Romance and English noun pluralisation patterns are also used on borrowed words.

Adjectives and adverbs
Adjectives follow nouns. There are no separately formed native adverbs, and word order is fairly flexible. Both nouns and adjectives of Semitic origin take the definite article (for example, It-tifel il-kbir, lit. "The boy the elder"="The elder boy"). This rule does not apply to adjectives of Romance origin.

Nouns
Nouns are pluralised and also have a dual marker. Semitic plurals are complex; if they are regular, they are marked by -iet/-ijiet, e.g., art, artijiet "lands (territorial possessions or property)" (cf. Arabic -at and Hebrew -ot/-oth) or -in (cf. Arabic -īn and Hebrew -im). If irregular, they fall in the pluralis fractus (broken plural) category, in which a word is pluralised by internal vowel changes: ktieb, kotba " book", "books"; raġel, irġiel "man", "men".

Words of Romance origin are usually pluralised in two manners: addition of -i or -jiet. For example, lingwa, lingwi "languages", from Sicilian lingua, lingui.

Words of English origin are pluralised by adding either an "-s" or "-jiet", for example, friġġ, friġis from the word fridge. Some words can be pluralised with either of the suffixes to denote the plural. A few words borrowed from English can amalgamate both suffixes, like brikksa from the English brick, which can adopt either collective form brikks or the plural form brikksiet.

Derivation

As in Arabic, nouns are often derived by changing, adding or removing the vowels within a triliteral root. These are some of the patterns used for nouns:

 CaCiC - xadin (monkey), sadid (rust)
 CCiC - żbib (raisin)
 CaCCa - baqra (cow), basla (onion)
 CeCCa - werqa (leaf), xewqa (wish)
 CoCCa - borka (wild duck), forka (gallows)
 CaCC - qalb (heart), sajd (fishing)
 CeCC - kelb (dog), xemx (sun)
 CCuCija - tfulija (boyhood), xbubija (maidenhood)
 CCuCa - rtuba (softness), bjuda (whiteness)
 CaCCaC - tallab (beggar), bajjad (whitewasher)

The so-called mimated nouns use the prefix m- in addition to vowel changes. This pattern can be used to indicate place names, tools, abstractions, etc. These are some of the patterns used for mimated nouns:

 ma-CCeC - marden (spindle)
 mi-CCeC - minkeb (elbow), miżwed (pod)
 mu-CCaC - musmar (nail), munqar (beak)

Article
The proclitic il- is the definite article, equivalent to "the" in English and "al-" in Arabic.

The Maltese article becomes l- before or after a vowel.
 l-omm (the mother)
 rajna l-Papa (we saw the Pope)
 il-missier (the father)

The Maltese article assimilates to a following coronal consonant (called konsonanti xemxin "sun consonants"), namely:
 Ċ iċ-ċikkulata (the chocolate)
 D id-dar (the house)
 N in-nar (the fire)
 R ir-razzett (the farm)
 S is-serrieq (the saw)
 T it-tifel (the boy)
 X ix-xemx (the sun)
 Ż iż-żarbuna (the shoe)
 Z iz-zalzett (the sausage)

Maltese il- is coincidentally identical in pronunciation to one of the Italian masculine articles, il. Consequently, many nouns borrowed from Standard Italian did not change their original article when used in Maltese. Romance vocabulary taken from Sicilian did change where the Sicilian articles u and a, before a consonant, are used.
In spite of its Romance appearance, il- is related to the Arabic article al-.

Verbs
Verbs show a triliteral Semitic pattern, in which a verb is conjugated with prefixes, suffixes, and infixes (for example ktibna, Arabic katabna, Hebrew kathabhnu (Modern Hebrew: katavnu) "we wrote"). There are two tenses: present and perfect. The Maltese verb system incorporates Romance verbs and adds Maltese suffixes and prefixes to them, for example; iddeċidejna "we decided" ← (i)ddeċieda "decide", a Romance verb + -ejna, a Maltese first person plural perfect marker.

An example would be the Semitic root X-M-X, which has something related to the sun, example: xemx (sun), xmux (suns), xemxi (sunny), xemxata (sunstroke), nixxemmex (I sunbathe), ma xxemmixtx (I didn't sunbathe), tixmix (the act of sunbathing). Maltese also features the stringing of verb suffixes indicating direction of action, for example; agħmilhomli "make them for me"← agħmel "make" in the imperative + hom from huma "them" + li suffix indicating first person singular; ħasletielu "she washed it for him"←ħaslet "she washed" from the verb ħasel "to wash" + ie the object + lu suffix indicating third person masculine singular.

Media

With Malta being a multilingual country, the usage of Maltese in the mass media is shared with other European languages, namely English and Italian. The majority of television stations broadcast from Malta in English or Maltese, although broadcasts from Italy in Italian are also received on the islands. Similarly, there are more Maltese-language radio programs than English ones broadcast from Malta, but again, as with television, Italian broadcasts are also picked up. Maltese generally receives equal usage in newspaper periodicals to English.

By the early 2000s, the use of the Maltese language on the Internet is uncommon, and the number of websites written in Maltese are few. In a survey of Maltese cultural websites conducted in 2004 on behalf of the Maltese Government, 12 of 13 were in English only, while the remaining one was multilingual but did not include Maltese.

Code-switching
The Maltese population, being fluent in both Maltese and English, displays code-switching (referred to as Maltenglish) in certain localities and between certain social groups.

See also

 Languages of Malta
 Maltese people

Footnotes

Notes

References

 
 
 
 
 
 Bugeja, Kaptan Pawlu, Kelmet il-Malti (Maltese—English, English—Maltese Dictionary). Associated News Group, Floriana. 1999.

Further reading 

 (it) Giovan Pietro Francesco Agius de Soldanis, Della lingua punica presentemente usata da maltesi, per Generoso Salomoni alla Piazza di S. Ignazio. Si vendono in Malta, 1750
 (it) Antonio Emanuele Caruana, Sull'origine della Lingua Maltese, Malta, Tipografia C. Busuttil, 1896
 (it) Giovanni Battista Falzon, Dizionario Maltese-Italiano-Inglese, G. Muscat, 1845 (1 ed.), 1882 (2 ed.)
 (it) Giuseppe Nicola Letard, Nuova guida alla conversazione italiana, inglese e maltese ad uso delle scuole, Malta, 1866-75
 (it) Fortunato Panzavecchia, Grammatica della Lingua Maltese, M. Weiss, Malta, 1845 
 (it) Michele Antonio Vassalli, Grammatica della lingua Maltese, 2 ed., Malta, 1827 
 (it) Michele Antonio Vassalli, Lexicon Melitense-Latino-Italum, Roma, Fulgonius, 1796
 (it) Francesco Vella, Osservazioni sull'alfabeto maltese, 1840
 (it) Francesca Morando, Il-lingwa Maltija. Origine, storia, comparazione linguistica e aspetti morfologici, Prefazione di Joseph M. Brincat, Palermo, Edizioni La Zisa, 2017, ISBN 978-88-9911-339-1
 (en) S. Mamo, English-Maltese Dictionary, Malta, A. Aquilina, 1885 
 (en) A Short Grammar of the Maltese Language, Malta, 1845
 (en) C. F. Schlienz, Views on the Improvement of the Maltese Language, Malta, 1838 
 (en) Francesco Vella, Maltese Grammar for the Use of the English, Glaucus Masi, Leghorn, 1831
 (en) Francesco Vella, Dizionario portatile delle lingue Maltese Italiana, Inglese. pt. 1, Livorno, 1843
 (en) Joseph Aquilina, Teach Yourself Maltese, English University Press, 1965
 (en) Geoffrey Hull, The Malta Language Question: A Case Study in Cultural Imperialism, Said International, Valletta, 1993
 (mt) Vicenzo Busuttil, Diziunariu mill Inglis ghall Malti, 2 parts, N. C. Cortis & Sons, Malta, 1900

External links

Maltese languages and literatures collection of L-Università ta' Malta

 
Central Semitic languages
Languages of Malta
Languages of Sicily
Subject–object–verb languages
Articles containing video clips